Harivand (also Romanized as Harīvand and Harīwand; also known as Harīvaneh) is a village in Mud Rural District, Mud District, Sarbisheh County, South Khorasan Province, Iran. At the 2006 census, its population was 158, in 59 families.

References 

Populated places in Sarbisheh County